Sympistis jocelynae is a moth of the family Noctuidae first described by James T. Troubridge in 2008. It is found in San Juan County, Utah, in the United States.

The wingspan is 32–35 mm. Adults are on wing in late September.

References

jocelynae
Moths described in 2008